Menzendorf is a municipality in the Nordwestmecklenburg district of Mecklenburg-Vorpommern, Germany.

People 
 Carl Heinrich von Siemens (1829-1906), German entrepreneur and industrialist

References

Nordwestmecklenburg